Twilight Peak is the highest summit of the West Needle Mountains range of the San Juan Mountains  System in southwestern Colorado.  

Climbing
The standard approach to Twilight Peak is via a trail from Molas Pass to the north. The trail leads to Crater Lake from where the summit is accessible.  Adjacent to Twilight Peak are North Twilight Peak (13,075 feet) and South Twilight Peak (12,932 feet).

See also
List of mountain peaks of Colorado

References

External links

Mountains of San Juan County, Colorado
San Juan Mountains (Colorado)
San Juan National Forest
North American 4000 m summits
Mountains of Colorado